Glandirana tientaiensis, also known as Tiantai frog and Tientai rough-skinned frog, is a species of frog in the family Ranidae. Its name refers to its type locality, Tiantai. It is endemic to eastern China and is only known from Zhejiang and south-eastern Anhui provinces.

Male G. tientaiensis measure  and female  in length. They sometimes also occur in still-water pools close to streams. This uncommon species is threatened by habitat loss.

References

tientaiensis
Frogs of China
Endemic fauna of China
Amphibians described in 1933
Taxonomy articles created by Polbot